The Needham–Schroeder protocol is one of the two key transport protocols intended for use over an insecure network, both proposed by Roger Needham and Michael Schroeder. These are:
 The Needham–Schroeder Symmetric Key Protocol, based on a symmetric encryption algorithm. It forms the basis for the Kerberos protocol. This protocol aims to establish a session key between two parties on a network, typically to protect further communication.
 The Needham–Schroeder Public-Key Protocol, based on public-key cryptography. This protocol is intended to provide mutual authentication between two parties communicating on a network, but in its proposed form is insecure.

The symmetric protocol
Here, Alice  initiates the communication to Bob .  is a server trusted by both parties. In the communication:

The protocol can be specified as follows in security protocol notation:

Alice sends a message to the server identifying herself and Bob, telling the server she wants to communicate with Bob.

The server generates  and sends back to Alice a copy encrypted under  for Alice to forward to Bob and also a copy for Alice. Since Alice may be requesting keys for several different people, the nonce assures Alice that the message is fresh and that the server is replying to that particular message and the inclusion of Bob's name tells Alice who she is to share this key with.

Alice forwards the key to Bob who can decrypt it with the key he shares with the server, thus authenticating the data.

Bob sends Alice a nonce encrypted under  to show that he has the key.

Alice performs a simple operation on the nonce, re-encrypts it and sends it back verifying that she is still alive and that she holds the key.

Attacks on the protocol 
The protocol is vulnerable to a replay attack (as identified by Denning and Sacco).

Fixing the attack 
This flaw is fixed in the Kerberos protocol by the inclusion of a timestamp. It can also be fixed with the  use of nonces as described below. At the beginning of the protocol:

 

Alice sends to Bob a request.

 

Bob responds with a nonce encrypted under his key with the Server.

 

Alice sends a message to the server identifying herself and Bob, telling the server she wants to communicate with Bob.

 

Note the inclusion of the nonce.

The protocol then continues as described through the final three steps as described in the original protocol above. The inclusion of this new nonce prevents the replaying of a compromised version of  since such a message would need to be of the form  which the attacker can't forge since she does not have .

The public-key protocol
This assumes the use of a public-key encryption algorithm.

Here, Alice  and Bob  use a trusted server  to distribute public keys on request. These keys are:

The protocol runs as follows:

 requests 's public keys from 

 responds with public key  alongside 's identity, signed by the server for authentication purposes.

 now knows A wants to communicate, so  requests 's public keys.

 Server responds.

These nonces are not known to eavesdroppers.

An attack on the protocol
This protocol is vulnerable to a man-in-the-middle attack.

 sends 

 relays it to 

 re-encrypts , and convinces  that she's decrypted it

The following example illustrates the attack. Alice (A) would like to contact her bank (B). We assume that an impostor (I) successfully convinces A that they are the bank. As a consequence A uses the public key of I instead of using the public key of B to encrypt the messages she intends to send to her bank. Therefore, A sends I her nonce encrypted with the public key of I. I decrypts the message using their private key and contacts B sending it the nonce of A encrypted with the public key of B. B has no way to know that this message was actually sent by I. B responds with their own nonce and encrypts the message with the public key of A. Since I is not in possession of the private key of A they have to relay the message to A without knowing the content. A decrypts the message with her private key and respond with the nonce of B encrypted with the public key of I. I decrypts the message using their private key and is now in possession of nonce A and B. Therefore, they can now impersonate the bank and the client respectively.

Fixing the man-in-the-middle attack 
The attack was first described in a 1995 paper by Gavin Lowe.
The paper also describes a fixed version of the scheme, referred to as the Needham–Schroeder–Lowe protocol. The fix involves the modification of message six to include the responder's identity, that is we replace:

with the fixed version:

and the intruder cannot successfully replay the message because A is expecting a message containing the identity of I whereas the message will have identity of B.

See also
 Kerberos
 Otway–Rees protocol
 Yahalom
 Wide Mouth Frog protocol
 Neuman–Stubblebine protocol
 Diffie-Hellman key exchange

References

External links

 

 

 
 Explanation of man-in-the-middle attack by Computerphile.

Authentication protocols
Key transport protocols
Symmetric-key cryptography
Computer access control protocols
Telecommunication protocols